Baudrecourt is the name of two communes in France:

 Baudrecourt, Haute-Marne, in the Haute-Marne département
 Baudrecourt, Moselle, in the Moselle département